Mogul Steamship Co Ltd v McGregor, Gow & Co [1892] AC 25 is an English tort law case concerning the economic tort of conspiracy to injure. A product of its time, the courts adhered to a laissez faire doctrine allowing firms to form a cartel, which would now be seen as contrary to the Competition Act 1998.

It is notable for Lord Bramwell's dictum that:

Facts
A group of ship owners formed an association (the Far Eastern Freight Conference) to raise their profits. The association agreed to limit the number of ships sent by the association to different ports, to give a 5% rebate on freights to all shippers of stock who dealt only with members, and that agents of members would be prohibited from dealing with anyone in the association if they did not deal exclusively with people in the association. If any member wished to withdraw, they would have to give notice. Mogul Steamship Co Ltd had been excluded. When it sent ships to the loading port to pick up cargo, the association sent more ships and underbid Mogul Steamship Co Ltd. The association also threatened to dismiss agents or withdraw rebates from anyone who dealt with Mogul Steamship Co Ltd. Mogul Steamship Co Ltd alleged there was a conspiracy to injure its economic interests and sued for compensation.

Judgment

Court of Appeal
The Court of Appeal held by a majority that the action taken was lawful. Lord Esher MR dissented, and Bowen LJ and Fry LJ formed the majority. Bowen LJ noted the following.

House of Lords
The House of Lords, affirming the Court of Appeal's decision, held that the acts were done with a lawful object of protecting and increasing the associations profits. Because no unlawful means had been employed, Mogul Steamship Co Ltd had no cause of action.

Lord Bramwell's judgment read as follows.

See also

English tort law
Vegelahn v. Guntner, 167 Mass. 92 (1896)
Loewe v. Lawlor, 208 U.S. 274 (1908)
Clayton Act 1914
History of United States antitrust law

Notes

United Kingdom company case law
English tort case law
House of Lords cases
1892 in British law
1892 in case law
United Kingdom competition law
Shipping in the United Kingdom